Candelaria pacifica is a widely distributed corticolous (bark-dwelling), leprose lichen. It was formally described as a species in 2011.

Taxonomy
Candelaria pacifica was formally described as a species in 2011 by Martin Westberg and Ulf Arup. Before that, it was often mistaken for other species in the Candelaria genus. Since its discovery, many older records have been reviewed and many herbarium specimens that were previously mislabeled have been reassessed as Candelaria pacifica.

Description
Small, lobate thallus up to 1 cm wide, shrubby appearance. Lobes are 0.1–0.6 mm wide.  Soredia formed on lobe tips and in margins, present on the lower side. Upper cortex is yellow, with shades of lemon, orange, or green present, smooth, up to 45 µm thick. Medulla is white and thin, and lower cortex is lacking. Rhizines are lacking. Apothecia are common, up to 1mm in diameter. Asci are clavate, containing 8 spores. Ascospores are colorless, contain lipid droplets, ellipsoid. Pycnidia appear on surface as orange warts, conidia are ellipsoid. K, C, KC, P tests all negative on surface and medulla.

Similar species
Often mistaken for Candelaria concolor, a differentiating aspect of C. pacifica is a lack or rare presence of rhizines. An 8 spored ascus is also present, compared to C. concolor which is polysporus. Candelaria pacifica also lacks a lower cortex and has soredia forming on the underside. Otherwise, both species are morphologically very similar. The formal declaration of C. pacifica as a species led to a review of herbarium specimens in many countries in Europe, in which it was found that many samples previously thought to be C. concolor were instead C. pacifica. It even led to C. concolor being considered a common species in many counties to being considered rare.

Habitat and distribution
As a lichen, C. pacifica grows attached to a substrate while supporting a population of green algae in a symbiotic relationship within its thallus. It mainly inhabits the nutrient rich bark of deciduous trees. Occasionally present on coniferous trees. Often on free standing trees or at forest edges. Can also grow on dead bark and wood not attached to currently living trees.

This species was first identified on the western coast of North America, where its range extends from the Sonoran Desert in the United States all the way up to the states of Washington and Idaho, stretching into Canada and South America. Its European distribution includes France, Belgium, Luxembourg, Poland, Estonia, Switzerland, Russia, Germany, the Netherlands, and Scandinavian counties. It has also been found in Iran.

References

Candelariales
Lichen species
Lichens of Europe
Lichens of North America
Lichens of South America
Lichens described in 2011
Lichens of Western Asia